Juliana (variants Julianna, Giuliana, Iuliana, Yuliana, etc) is a feminine given name which is the feminine version of the Roman name Julianus.
Juliana or Giuliana was the name of a number of early saints, notably Saint Julian the Hospitaller, which ensured the name's continued popularity in the medieval period.

People with the given name Juliana or Julianna

Medieval
Ordered chronologically
Julianna of Paul and Juliana (died 270), Christian martyr during the Aurelian persecution
St. Juliana of Nicomedia (died 304), Christian martyr during the Diocletian persecution
St. Juliana (a martyr associated with the legend of Saint Cucuphas
Juliana Grenier (died between 1213 and 1216)
St. Juliana of Liège (1193–1252), nun and visionary from Retinnes in Fléron in the Bishopric of Liège, now in Belgium
St. Juliana Falconieri (1270–1341), Italian foundress of the Servite Third Order
Juliana or Julian of Norwich (1342–1416), English anchoress, Christian mystic and theologian
Juliana Holszanska (1375–1448), third wife of Vytautas the Great, Grand Duke of Lithuania
Juliana Berners (1388–?), English writer on heraldry, hawking and hunting, said to have been a prioress

Early modern
Ordered chronologically
Juliana of Stolberg (1506–1580), German noble, mother of William the Silent
St. Juliana Olshanskaya (c. 1525 - c. 1540) 
Juliana of Lazarevo (1530–1604), saint of the Orthodox Church
Juliana, Guaraní woman from early-colonial Paraguay, known for killing her Spanish master and urging other indigenous women to do the same
Juliana Morell (1594-1653),Spanish Dominican nun and the first woman to receive a Doctor of Laws degree
Juliana of Hesse-Darmstadt (1606–1659), wife of Count Ulrich II of East Frisia
Juliana of Hesse-Eschwege (1652–1693), German noble
Juliana Schierberg (died 1712), Swedish chamber maid and confidante of Princess Hedvig Sophia of Sweden
Juliana Dias da Costa (1658–1733), Christian woman of Portuguese descent who was influential in the court of the Mughal Empire
Juliana Annesley, Countess of Anglesey (died 1777)
Juliana Maria of Brunswick-Wolfenbüttel (1729–1796), queen of Denmark between 1752 and 1766
Juliana de Lannoy (1738–1782), Dutch artist and poet

Modern
Ordered alphabetically by last name
Juliana of the Netherlands (1909–2004), queen regnant of the Kingdom of the Netherlands
Juliana Addison (born 1974), Australian politician
Juliana Alves (born 1982), Brazilian actress
Juliana Awada (born 1974), Argentine businesswoman and first lady
Juliana Areias (born 1975), Brazilian singer-songwriter
Juliana Azumah-Mensah (born 1950), Ghanaian politician and former Minister for Women and Children's Affairs
Juliana Baroni (born 1978), Brazilian actress
Juliana Blou (born 1995), Namibian footballer
Juliana Buhring (born 1981), British-German cyclist and writer
Juliana Cabral (born 1981), Brazilian footballer
Juliana Cannarozzo (born 1989), American figure skater and actress
Juliana Canfield (born 1992), American actress
Juliana Cardoso, Brazilian activist and politician
Juliana Carneiro da Cunha (born 1949), Brazilian actress and ballet dancer
Juliana Castro (footballer) (born 1991), Uruguayan footballer
Juliana Cerqueira Leite (born 1981), Brazilian sculptor
Juliana Chen, Chinese-Canadian magician
Juliana Delgado Lopera (born 1988), Colombian writer and performer
Juliana Dever (born 1980), American actress
Juliana Di Tullio (born 1971), Argentine psychologist and politician
Juliana Didone (born 1984), Brazilian actress
Juliana Esteves dos Santos (born 1984), Brazilian rugby union player
Juliana Evans (born 1989), Malaysian actress
Juliana Horatia Ewing (1841-1885), English children's writer
Juliana Felisberta (born 1983), Brazilian beach volleyball player
Juliana R. Force (1876-1948), American museum administrator and director
Juliana Francis, American playwright and actress
Juliana Freire, Brazilian computer scientist
Juliana Furtado (born 1967), American mountain biker
Juliana Gaviria (born 1991), Colombian cyclist
Juliana González Valenzuela (born 1936), Mexican philosopher
Juliana Gromova (1924–1943), Ukrainian Soviet World War II anti-Nazi resistance member
Julianna Guill (born 1987), American actress
Juliana Hall (born 1958), American composer
Juliana Harkavy (born 1985), American actress
Juliana Hatfield (born 1967), American actress and guitarist/songwriter
Juliana Hodkinson (born 1971), British composer
Juliana Huxtable (born 1987), American artist, writer, performer, and DJ
Juliana Jendo (born 1952), Assyrian singer
Juliana Kaduya (born 1979), Malawian politician
Juliana Kakraba (born 1979), Ghanain footballer
Juliana Kanyomozi (born 1981), Ugandan pop musician
Juliana Klarisa (born 2002), Indonesian weightlifter
Juliana Knust (born 1981), Brazilian actress
Juliana Young Koo (1905-2017), Chinese-American diplomat
Juliana Laffitte (born 1974), Argentine artist
Juliana Larena y Fenollé (1790-1835), Spanish nurse
Juliana Latifi, Albanian professor and judge
 Julianna Grace LeBlanc (born 2004), American YouTuber, actress, singer, and model
Juliana Lima (born 1982), Brazilian mixed martial artist
Juliana Emma Linter (1844-1909), British conchologist and collector
Juliana Lohmann (born 1989), Brazilian actress
Juliana Luecking, American musician and video maker
Juliana Machado Ferreira (born 1980), Brazilian conservation geneticist and activist
Juliana Malacarne (born 1974), Brazilian bodybuilder
Julianna Margulies (born 1966), American actress
Juliana Martins (born 1984), Brazilian model
Julianna Rose Mauriello (born 1991), American actress
Julianna McCarthy (born 1929), American actress
Juliana Mialoundama (born 1993), French basketball player
Juliana Mickwitz (1889–1976), translator, linguist and cryptanalyst, inducted into the Cryptologic Hall of Honor
Julianna Naoupu (born 1990), New Zealand netball player
Juliana Negedu (born 1979), Nigerian basketball player
Juliana Nero (born 1979), Vincentian cricketer
Juliana Neuhuber (born 1979), Austrian director, screenwriter, and artist
Juliana Makuchi Nfah-Abbenyi, Cameroonian professor and writer
Juliana Nogueira (born 1988), Brazilian volleyball player
Juliana Olayode (born 1995), Nigerian actress and activist
Juliana Paes (born 1979), Brazilian actress
Juliana Paiva (born 1993), Brazilian actress
Juliana Pasha (born 1980), Albanian singer
Juliana Paula dos Santos (born 1983), Brazilian middle-distance runner
Juliana Pegues, American writer, performer, and activist
Juliana Geran Pilon, Romanian-American writer and academic
Juliana Rimane (born 1959), French Guianan politician
Juliana Rojas (born 1981), Brazilian filmmaker
Juliana Rotich (born 1977), Kenyan information technology professional
Juliana Sayumi Terao (born 1991), Brazilian chess player
Juliana Schalch (born 1985), Brazilian actress
Juliana Schroeder, American behavioral scientist
Juliana Seraphim (born 1934), Palestinian artist
Juliana Shonza (born 1987), Tanzanian politician
Juliana Silveira (born 1980), Brazilian actress and singer
Julianna Smoot (born 1967), American political fundraiser
Juliana Spahr (born 1966), American poet, critic, and editor
Juliana Stratton (born 1965), American politician
Juliana Taimoorazy (born 1973), Assyrian-American activist
Juliana Thiessen-Day (born 1980), Norwegian-Canadian model and beauty pageant contestant
Julianna Tudja (born 1979), Hungarian hammer thrower
Juliana Velasquez (born 1986), Brazilian mixed martial artist
Juliana Veloso (born 1980), Brazilian diver
Juliana Walanika (1846–1931), court musician in the Kingdom of Hawaii
Juliana Wang (1929-1993), American cinematographer
Juliana Westray (1778-1838), American stage actress
Juliana Yasin (1970-2014), Singaporean artist and curator
Juliana Yendork (born 1972), Ghanaian-American long jumper and triple jumper

Animals
Juliana (dog) (died 1946), a Great Dane awarded two Blue Cross medals

See also
, a given name
Yuliana, a given name
Iuliana, a given name
Uliana, a list of people with the given name Uliana or Ulyana

Feminine given names